The following is a selective list of notable alumni of the Northern Secondary School, in Toronto, Ontario.

List

Television and film

Professional sports

Arts and literature

Music

Fashion

Military

Business

Humanitarianism, activism, social work and others

References

External links 
A larger list at NSS

Lists of Canadian people by school affiliation
Lists of people from Ontario